The Ballerina is a  bronze sculpture by Mike Larsen, installed in Oklahoma City's Civic Center Music Hall, in the U.S. state of Oklahoma. The statue commemorates the legacy of Yvonne Chouteau, Rosella Hightower, Moscelyne Larkin, Majorie Tallchief, and Maria Tallchief, five Native American women ballet dancers named "Oklahoma's treasures" by former Governor Frank Keating. The sculpture was unveiled in 2007.

See also

 2007 in art

References

2007 establishments in Oklahoma
2007 sculptures
Ballet in the United States
Dance in art
Monuments and memorials in Oklahoma
Sculptures of women in Oklahoma
Statues in Oklahoma